Lei Tenglong (born 17 January 1991) is a former Chinese international footballer.

Club career
Lei Tenglong started his football career in 2003 playing for Beijing Guoan's youth academy. He was then loaned to S.League side Beijing Guoan Talent during the 2010 season. He made his debut for the club on 12 February 2010 in a 1-0 loss against Étoile FC. He returned to Beijing in July 2010 and was promoted to the first team in 2011. He made his debut for the club on 25 April 2011 in a 3-0 win against Dalian Shide. He scored his first goal for the club on 6 July 2011 in a 3-0 win against Shanghai Shenhua. Lei played eight league matches in his debut season; however, he appeared in just one match during the 2012 season due to injury.

On 31 July 2013, Lei was loaned to Primeira Liga side Marítimo until 30 June 2014. He mostly played for Segunda Liga side Marítimo B and established himself as a starter for the club during the second half of the 2013-14 season. Upon his return from his loan spell Lei would go on to establish himself as regular within the Beijing team and went on to win the 2018 Chinese FA Cup with the club.

On 26 February 2020, Lei joined Tianjin TEDA on a 2-year deal. He would make his debut in a league game on 27 July 2020 in a 3-1 defeat to Shanghai Port. This would be his only appearance for the club as he was suffering from ankle and ligament damage throughout the entire season. On 30 July 2021, Lei joined Hebei F.C. on a free transfer. He would not make any appearances for Hebei and retired at the end of the season after he was unable to recover from his ankle and ligament injury.

International career
Lei made his debut for the Chinese national team on 5 August 2015 in a 2-0 win against North Korea.

Career statistics

Club statistics

International statistics

Honours

Club
Beijing Guoan
Chinese FA Cup: 2018

References

External links
 
 

1991 births
Living people
Chinese footballers
Footballers from Wuhan
Beijing Guoan F.C. players
C.S. Marítimo players
Tianjin Jinmen Tiger F.C. players
Singapore Premier League players
Primeira Liga players
Chinese Super League players
Chinese expatriate footballers
Expatriate footballers in Portugal
Association football defenders
China international footballers